Usue Maitane Arconada and Sofia Kenin were the defending champions, but chose not to participate this year.

Hayley Carter and Ena Shibahara won the title, defeating Quinn Gleason and Luisa Stefani in the final, 7–5, 5–7, [10–7].

Seeds

Draw

Draw

References
Main Draw

Stockton Challenger - Doubles